is one of the five wards of Kumamoto City, Japan. Meaning literally "south ward," it is bordered by the Nishi-ku, Chūō-ku, Higashi-ku and also by the cities of Uki, Uto and the towns of Kashima, Mifune and Kōsa. As of 2012, it has a population of 122,773 people and an area of 110.02 km2.

External links

Wards of Kumamoto